Stelios Sfakianakis (born 19 March 1976) is a Greek former professional footballer who played as a midfielder.

Career
Born in Hagen, Sfakianakis moved to Greece where he began his professional career with Kavala F.C., where he played in the Beta Ethniki and Alpha Ethniki. He transferred to Olympiacos F.C. in December 1996 and played in 38 Alpha Ethniki matches for the club over three and one-half seasons.

Honours

Club
Olympiacos
Greek Championship: 1997, 1998, 1999, 2000
Greek Cup: 1999

References

External links
Profile at Onsports.gr

1976 births
Living people
Greek footballers
Greek expatriate footballers
Super League Greece players
Football League (Greece) players
Cypriot First Division players
Kavala F.C. players
Olympiacos F.C. players
Xanthi F.C. players
OFI Crete F.C. players
Atromitos F.C. players
Panetolikos F.C. players
Olympiakos Nicosia players
Expatriate footballers in Cyprus
Association football midfielders
People from Kavala (regional unit)
Sportspeople from Eastern Macedonia and Thrace